The post of Surveyor of the Fabric of Westminster Abbey was established in 1698. The role is an architectural one, with the current holder being responsible for the upkeep and maintenance of the Abbey and its buildings. In the past, the role has involved overseeing new construction work as well as restoration and architectural conservation. The post has been held by the following people:

Christopher Wren (1698–1723)
Nicholas Hawksmoor (1723–1736)
John James (1736–1746)
James Horne (1746–1752)
Henry Keene (1752–1776)
James Wyatt (1776–1813)
Benjamin Dean Wyatt (1813–1827)
Edward Blore (1827–1849)
George Gilbert Scott (1849–1878)
John Loughborough Pearson (1878–1897)
John Thomas Micklethwaite (1897–1906)
William Lethaby (1906–1928)
Walter Tapper (1928–1935)
Charles Reed Peers (1935–1951)
Stephen Dykes Bower (1951–1973)
(John) Peter Foster (1973–1988)
Donald Buttress (1988–1999)
John Burton (1999–2012)
Ptolemy Dean (2012–present)

Notes

References

Further reading

 
Westminster Abbey